El Zorro pierde el pelo is a 1950 Argentine film and is a black and white film directed by Mario C. Lugones on the screenplay of Carlos A. Petit which premiered on 16 of November 1950 and had starring Pepe Iglesias, Fidel Pintos, Mary Esther Ranges, Patricia Castell, Homero Cárpena and Nathan Pinzon . He also collaborated in the frame Enrique Vico Carré .

Synopsis
The bride and future father of a womanizer try to teach her a lesson.

Cast
 Pepe Iglesias - Pedro Medina
 Fidel Pintos - Enrique
 María Esther Gamas - Vicky
 Patricia Castell - Liliana
 Homero Cárpena - Cayetano Orloff
 Nathán Pinzón - Loco asesino
 Pedro Pompilio - Medina padre
 Ángel Prío - Hombre en casa de empeño
 Germán Vega - Canuto
 Nelly Panizza - Maquilladora
 Celia Geraldy - Enfermera
 Adolfo Linvel - Lázaro
 Alberto Quiles - Portero 1 Círculo social
 Nicolás Taricano - Portero 2 Círculo social
 Aída Villadeamigo - Secretaria del Sr. Medina
 Tessy Raines - Fabiola
 Olga Gatti - Bailarina
 Teresa Pintos - Bailarina
 Eduardo de Labar - Tántaro
 Fernando Campos 
 Ermete Meliante
 Aurelio Molina
 Sara Santana
 Jaime Saslavsky
 Virginia de la Cruz

External links
 

1950 films
1950s Spanish-language films
Argentine black-and-white films
Argentine comedy films
1950 comedy films
1950s Argentine films